A bicycle rodeo is a clinic to teach children the skills and precautions to ride a bicycle safely.

Origin 
In the United States, Kiwanis clubs originated the idea of teaching bicycle safety to organized groups of children. They set up bicycle lectures which then became bicycle seminars. Eventually, a more hands on approach was used to teach the children and the term bicycle rodeo was adopted. This name is much more attractive to children and helped the events to grow in popularity. In Denmark a similar concept called mobil cykelbanes (mobile bicycle playgrounds) was introduced about 2012.

Organizers 
Bicycle rodeos are usually run by local police departments. Police Chief Rosanne M. Sizer of the Portland, Oregon Police Department said, "It's important that our children understand bicycle safety. This is an opportunity for area youth to learn important skills and in the process get to know some of our bicycle, traffic, and reserve officers." The Kiwanis clubs still run rodeos with the police departments. Others who run rodeos are schools, outdoor recreation companies, the Boy Scouts of America, State Farm Insurance, and large bicycle shops or sporting goods stores.

Activities 

Bicycle Rodeos are usually for the age group of 4–13 years old. The activities that are provided are suitable for each age so that no one is bored during the event. Each rodeo usually begins with a short lecture on bicycle safety and is then followed by a written exam to test the child's knowledge of bicycle use. Each rodeo has some type of a road course; this is usually the children's favorite part of the entire day. Some rodeos have more funding which allows them to build a small town for the children to ride around in as if it were real. This small town is called Safety Town. Throughout the town there are real life situations such as traffic lights, stop signs, pedestrians crossing the streets, and road intersections. The children learn to handle riding their bikes in this life like setting.  Rodeos are a popular place for businesses to come and set up booths to sell bike related products and give away gifts to the children. Many times local radio stations will broadcast their shows live from the rodeo and provide music to add to the experience.

Eight stations 
In a typical bicycle rodeo there are eight different stations with chalk courses that the children have to master in order to pass the course. The objective of each course is to make sure that each child knows how to operate his or her bike correctly. The stations are: mounting and dismounting the bicycle, changing direction and turning in circles, steering through tight spaces, weaving, having the ability to stop quickly, turning around, riding the bicycle very slowly while maintaining balance, and learning to maneuver tight turns.

Safety 
Every Bicycle rodeo has a safety course. Most rodeos begin the course with the safety check for both the rider and the bicycle because it is very important. The safety check for the rider is the helmet and bicycle fit. An ABC quick check is performed on the bicycle. The ABC quick check consists of checking for proper air in the tires, checking to see that the brakes work, and checking that the chains are on properly.

Other activities 
Bicycle rodeo vary in what they offer. There are always plenty of fun things to do. After each child is finished with the safety course they are free to go around to the different booths to check out what they have. There is usually plenty of food and free prizes. A local bicycle shop might be giving away a bell or light for the bicycle. There might also be competitions held where the children can show off their newly learned skills. Some of the competitions may involve racing. Whatever activities a bicycle rodeo may offer, you can be sure it will be a safe and fun filled day.

See also
 Cyclecide — a traveling show called "The Bike Rodeo", not a children's safety clinic

Notes

References

 "Bicycle Rodeos". Bicycling Life. Retrieved on June 29, 2008
 "Bicycle Rodeo Information". Safe Kids. Retrieved on June 29, 2008
 "Safe Routes To School". Retrieved June 29, 2008

Cycling safety